The Benton Foundation is a nonprofit organization set up by former U.S. Senator William Benton and his wife, Helen Hemingway Benton. Their son, Charles Benton, served as chairman and CEO until his death in 2015.

The Benton Foundation was the owner of the Encyclopædia Britannica from 1974 until 1996, when it was bought by Jacqui Safra.

History
The formation of the Benton Foundation was announced at the bicentennial banquet for the Britannica in 1968. The mission of the Foundation was re-vamped somewhat in 1981 by Charles Benton, but it has always focused on using media for the public good, particularly for educational purposes.

In 1992, Benton launched the Communications Policy Program with a grant from MacArthur Foundation, the first major grant he had received.

Since 2001, Benton is home for the US center for OneWorld.net, a global information service, search engine, and network of organizations working for sustainable development and human rights.

In recent years, the Foundation has been most famous for its championing of digital access and for demanding public responsibility by mass media.  The Benton Foundation has pushed for a national broadband policy at the highest levels of U.S. government.  It has also been pushing the Federal Communications Commission (FCC) to determine the public interest obligations of digital television broadcasters.   Finally, it has sponsored studies that suggest that concentration of media ownership in a few hands is not in the interests of the United States.

Leonard Jay Schrager became new chairman of Benton in 2015 following the death of Benton Foundation Founder and Chairman Charles Benton who died on 29 April 2015.

Funding
Funding details as of 2018:

Awards

Charles Benton Digital Equity Champion Award
The Charles Benton Digital Equity Champion Award honors governance and commitment to improving digital equity which ranges from propagating accessible and affordable communications technology for all Americans and its successful implementation.

Award winners:
 2016 David Keyes

Charles Benton Next Generation Engagement Award
The Charles Benton Next Generation Engagement Award is a City award for competitive civic innovation which find groundbreaking and creative solutions to local challenges.

Recipients include:
 2016 Raleigh, NC
 2016 Austin, TX
 2016 Louisville, KY

Honors
On 9 February 2007, Benton Foundation Chairman and CEO Charles Benton received the Susan G. Hadden Pioneer Award from the Alliance for Public Technology for "pioneering efforts in telecommunications and consumer access."

References

External links
 
 Digital Divide Network
 Connect for Kids
 Sound Partners for Community Health

Internet-related activism
Digital divide activists
Foundations based in the United States
Encyclopædia Britannica